The Diocese of Coxim is a Latin Church ecclesiastical territory or diocese of the Catholic Church in Mato Grosso do Sul state, southwestern inland Brazil. It is a suffragan in the ecclesiastical province of the metropolitan Archdiocese of Campo Grande.

Its cathedral episcopal see is Catedral São José, dedicated to Saint Joseph, in the city of Coxim.

History 
 Established on January 3, 1978 as Territorial Prelature of Coxim, on territory split off from the then Diocese of Campo Grande (now its metropolitan see)
 November 13, 2002: Promoted as Diocese of Coxim

Statistics and extent 
, it pastorally served 110,000 Catholics (78.0% of 141,000 total) on 45,000 km² (the municipalities Coxim, Alcinópolis, Camapuã, Costa Rica, Figueirão, Pedro Gomes, Rio Negro, Rio Verde de Mato Grosso, São Gabriel do Oeste and Sonora) in 14 parishes with 17 priests (15 diocesan, 2 religious), 1 deacon, 22 lay religious (4 brothers, 18 sisters) and 8 seminarians.

Episcopal ordinaries
Territorial Prelates of Coxim  
 Clóvis Frainer, Capuchin Friars Minor (O.F.M. Cap.) (1978.01.03 – 1985.01.05), next Metropolitan Archbishop of Manaus (Brazil) (1985.01.05 – 1991.05.22), Metropolitan Archbishop of Juiz de Fora (Brazil) (1991.05.22 – retired 2001.11.28); died 2017
 Ângelo Domingos Salvador, O.F.M. Cap. (1986.05.16 – 1991.07.17), previously Titular Bishop of Selia (1981.03.16 – 1986.05.16) as Auxiliary Bishop of Archdiocese of São Salvador da Bahia (Brazil) (1981.03.16 – 1986.05.16); later Bishop of Cachoeira do Sul (Brazil) (1991.07.17 – 1999.05.26), Bishop of Uruguaiana (Brazil) (1999.05.26 – retired 2007.06.27)
 Osório Bebber, O.F.M. Cap. (1992.01.18 – 1999.03.17), previously Coadjutor Bishop of Tubarão (Brazil) (1979.11.30 – 1981.09.17), succeeding as Bishop of Tubarão (1981.09.17 – 1992.01.18); later Bishop of Joaçaba (Brazil) (1999.03.17 – retired 2003.04.09)
 Antonino Migliore (born Italy) (2000.05.10 – 2002.11.13 see below), no previous prelature

Suffragan Bishops of Coxim
 Antonino Migliore (see above 2002.11.13 – 2022.10.19).
 Otair Nicoletti (2022.10.19 – ...).

Sources and external links 
 GCatholic.org - data for all sections
 Catholic Hierarchy
 Diocese website (Portuguese)

Roman Catholic dioceses in Brazil
Religious organizations established in 1978
Roman Catholic Ecclesiastical Province of Campo Grande
Roman Catholic dioceses and prelatures established in the 20th century